How It Works was the fourth studio album from Australian punk-rock group Bodyjar. The album peaked number 19 on the ARIA Charts. The track "Not the Same" was featured in the 2001 skateboarding video game Tony Hawk's Pro Skater 3. The album was released in the US through Nitro Records to coincide with the band's appearance on the 2001 Warped Tour.

Track listing 
"Not the Same" 	
"Feed It" 	
"Ordinary Lives" 	
"Make It Up"	
"No Payback" 	
"Calling Orson"	
"Fall to the Ground" 	
"Good Enough"	
"Five Minutes Away (When Punx Attack Magicians)"	
"Another Day" 	
"Clean Slate" 	
"Running out of Time"

Charts

Release dates

Notes
The Japanese issue comes with two bonus tracks -

1) "Self Inflicted" (previously released on Not the Same EP in Australia)
2) "Halfway Around the World" (previously released on Fall to the Ground EP in Australia)

The disc was re-issued in limited numbers in Australia as a 2-CD set which included the You Got Me A Girls Bike You Idiot! EP. This double CD Issue was first released with picture discs identical to the original releases (of How It Works and You Got Me A Girl's Bike You Idiot!), then subsequently with silver discs.

EMI also released the 2CD version of How It Works with Plastic Skies as a double album promotion in August 2005. Both albums were in their own jewel cases with full original artwork, and both were silver discs. They were packaged together in a card slipcase.

References

2000 albums
Bodyjar albums